La Pointe  is a quartier of Saint Barthélemy in the Caribbean. It is located in the western part of the island at the end of Gustavia.

Populated places in Saint Barthélemy
Quartiers of Saint Barthélemy